Willem "Wim" Meijer (born 16 August 1939) is a retired Dutch politician and businessman. He is a member of the Labour Party (PvdA).

Meijer worked as a social worker in Hengelo from April 1964 until May 1971. Meijer served on the Municipal Council of Hengelo from June 1966 until July 1970. Meijer also was active as a political activist and was one of the leaders of the New Left movement in the Netherlands which aimed to steer the Labour Party more to the Left. Meijer was elected as a Member of the House of Representatives after the election of 1971, taking office on 11 May 1971. After the election of 1972 Meijer was appointed as State Secretary for Culture, Recreation and Social Work in the Cabinet Den Uyl, taking office on 11 May 1973. The Cabinet Den Uyl fell on 22 March 1977 and continued to serve in a demissionary capacity. After the election of 1977 Meijer returned as a Member of the House of Representatives, taking office on 8 June 1977 but he was still serving in the cabinet and because of dualism customs in the constitutional convention of Dutch politics he couldn't serve a dual mandate he subsequently resigned as State Secretary on 8 September 1977. After the election of 1981 the Leader of the Labour Party and Parliamentary leader of the Labour Party in the House of Representatives Joop den Uyl was appointed as Deputy Prime Minister and Minister of Social Affairs and Employment in the Cabinet Van Agt II, Meijer was selected as his successor as Parliamentary leader in the House of Representatives, taking office on 11 September 1981. The Cabinet Van Agt II fell just seven months into its term on 12 May 1982 and continued to serve in a demissionary capacity until it was replaced by the caretaker Cabinet Van Agt III on 29 May 1982. After the election of 1982 Den Uyl subsequently returned as a Member of the House of Representatives and as Parliamentary leader in the House of Representatives on 16 September 1982.

On 14 October 1988 Meijer was nominated as Queen's Commissioner of Drenthe, he resigned as a Member of the House of Representatives the same day he was installed as Queen's Commissioner of Drenthe, taking office on 1 January 1989.

Decorations

References

External links

Official
  W. (Wim) Meijer Parlement & Politiek

 

 

 

1939 births
Living people
Businesspeople from Amsterdam
Commanders of the Order of Orange-Nassau
Dutch bankers
Dutch chief executives in the finance industry
Dutch chief executives in the rail transport industry
Dutch corporate directors
Dutch humanists
Dutch nonprofit directors
Dutch nonprofit executives
Dutch social justice activists
Dutch social workers
King's and Queen's Commissioners of Drenthe
Knights of the Order of the Netherlands Lion
Labour Party (Netherlands) politicians
Social workers
Members of the House of Representatives (Netherlands)
Municipal councillors in Overijssel
Politicians from Amsterdam
People from Slochteren
State Secretaries for Social Work of the Netherlands
20th-century Dutch businesspeople
20th-century Dutch civil servants
20th-century Dutch politicians
21st-century Dutch businesspeople
21st-century Dutch civil servants